The Honda SL70 Motosport, which was introduced in 1970, is a small street/trail motorcycle with a four-stroke engine, a four-speed manual gearbox, and a full-cradle frame. The bike was extremely popular with younger riders who used it off-road as a trail bike and mini motocrosser. For the latter role, it was essentially replaced by Honda's XR75 in 1973.

Specifications
Year of Production: 1970–1973
Displacement: 
Engine: Four-stroke, aircooled, single overhead cam, single
Ignition: Breaker points, 6 volts
Power 6.5 PS (4.8 kW) @ 9,500 rpm
Transmission:4 speed manual
Fuel system: Carburetor
Valves: 2 valves per cylinder

The vast majority of production of this model went to the American market. The bike was not officially sold in the UK.

In 1970, it was designated the SL70K0, 1971 the SL70K1, 1972 the SL70K2, and 1973 the SL70K3. Except for paint colors and the addition of a speedometer, the bike was unchanged in those four years. (When first introduced, its main competition in the marketplace was the Yamaha Mini Enduro 60.) In 1974, the designation changed to XL70 and the bike got a slimmer gas tank.

SL70
Motorcycles introduced in 1970